Ana Julia Bridges is an assistant professor at the department of psychological science, University of Arkansas, and one of the chief editors of the journal Sexualization, Media, and Society.

Education 
Bridges received her PhD in clinical psychology from the University of Rhode Island in 2007.

Bibliography

Books

Chapters in books 
  Pdf.

Journal articles 

2000 - 2004
 
  View online.

2005 - 2009
 
 

2010 - 2014
  Pdf.
 
 
 
 
 
  Pdf.
 
 
 
 
 
 
 

2015 onwards
 
 
 
 
  View online.
 
 
 
 
 
 
  (Online first.)
 
 
 Bridges, Ana J.; McGahan, Tara (in preparation). "What traits do men and women want in a romantic partner? Stated preferences versus actual behavior"

Media

References

External links 
 Profile page: Ana J. Bridges  University of Arkansas

American women academics
American feminist writers
American mass media scholars
American social activists
Gender studies academics
Living people
Mass media theorists
Place of birth missing (living people)
University of Arkansas faculty
University of Rhode Island alumni
Year of birth missing (living people)